Iridana tororo is a butterfly in the family Lycaenidae. It is found in eastern Uganda and western Kenya. Indeed, the species which these belong to can be found across Africa, in the Afrotropical Realm.

References

Butterflies described in 1964
Poritiinae